Erwanping is a railway station on the Forestry Bureau Alishan Forest Railway line located in Alishan Township, Chiayi County, Taiwan.

History
The station was opened on 1 October 1912 as the terminal station of Alishan Forest Railway. In 1914, the railway further expanded and the terminal station changed to Zhaoping Station.

Nearby stations
 <-- Alishan Forest railway -->

See also
 List of railway stations in Taiwan

References

1912 establishments in Taiwan
Alishan Forest Railway stations
Railway stations in Chiayi County
Railway stations opened in 1912